Lit Motors Inc. is a San Francisco-based company that designed conceptual two-wheeled vehicles, including a fully electric, gyroscopically stabilized vehicle.

Founded by Daniel K. Kim in 2010, Lit Motors designed concepts for two-wheeled vehicles with a focus on innovative technologies. They have released information about two projects: the AEV (auto-balancing electric vehicle) often referred to as the "C-1" and the Kubo cargo scooter. The inspiration for Lit Motors came to Kim in 2003, when he was nearly crushed by a chassis while manually assembling a bio-diesel Land Rover Defender 90. Kim decided to "chop a car in half" to create what is now the C-1.

Legal Issues

Lit Motors has been sued twice by four early investors, resulting in approximately $300,000 in legal judgments against Lit Motors and an arrest order against Kim for failure to appear at court hearings related to these lawsuits.  On January 7, 2020, a San Francisco court granted a motion assigning Lit Motor's US patents to the plaintiffs in this lawsuit and restraining Lit Motors from selling its patents.
Later in January a settlement was reached and paid. The patents were reassigned back to Lit.

Designs

AEV / C-1

Early in 2010, the company revealed a non-functioning show model of the C-1. The design vision showcased an enclosed two-wheeled vehicle self-balanced by two single-gimbal control moment gyroscopes, to be powered by lithium iron phosphate batteries. Design specifications indicated that it could hold a second passenger, though no model or pictures other than computer renderings showed more than single-passenger capacity. Computer renderings of a two passenger model indicate that the tight space would likely not be suitable for long trips, as the area behind the driver's seat is very limited, in a semi-reclined position, with legs straddling the front seat.

Similar to a motorcycle, the original C-1 design has two wheels, but uses a small steering wheel instead of handlebars. Direct-drive in-hub motors in both wheels were designed to provide a high amount of torque, stability and traction control, while allowing for the body form to be about half the size of a car. Prototypes show neither wheel with direct drive and only a single person capacity, indicating that the design may be undergoing changes.

Safety features were intended to include a steel unibody chassis, seat belts, airbags, and a gyroscope stability system.

*Range per charge based on a constant speed of 60 mph, coefficient of drag of 0.2, and battery capacity of 13kWh, according to the September 2016 email newsletter.

Production timeline

In 2011, the company announced plans for a first small production run in 2013, with the intention of selling the C-1 for $16,000. This initial price was typically referred to as $24,000, but varied depending on the state and federal tax incentives available at the time. The company began taking pre-order deposits through a tiered system priced from $250 to $10,000.

At the November 2012 Gigaom Roadmap Conference, a Lit representative said that the company had "another couple years engineering work before it's really ready to go on a small scale production. By a couple, I mean a year, two years or so, and then another couple years after that to scale to a big manufacturing." In a later interview by Gigaom, Daniel Kim stated that the C-1 was still about 2 to 2.5 years from production. The May 28, 2013 interview date meant that he was expecting the C-1 to be produced around May - November 2015.

In May 2014, Kim said his company was working around the clock to get a product that is ready for production within eight months, with 20 full-time employees. However, February 2015 passed without any indication that production had started or that additional employees were involved in the project. While Lit posted a few updates in 2015, they were all for a prototype that still appeared to be far from ready for production.
 
In February, 2016, Forbes released an article which Lit Motors promoted, including a new production timeline. "Today [Daniel Kim] is close to securing a new round of funding–a year later than planned. The money will be used to facilitate the next challenging stage of growth: building infrastructure from the ground up. His plan is to have a production-ready prototype in 24 months." The oft-mentioned 2 year timeline remained, despite no outwardly visible progress on designs or funding to move forward.
 
On May 24, 2016 at the Pioneers.io Festival, Danny Kim presented on the Lit AEV stating, "I know that if we put 20 million dollars into our bank account today, we'll be able to deliver it in 2 years - 24 months." This yet again uses the 2-year timeline that Lit is locked into every time the question arises.
 
A September 22, 2016 Forbes article speculated on Lit Motor's past and future: "The iPhone maker has also conducted several meetings with Lit Motors ... Apple met with Lit CEO Daniel Kim earlier this year to discuss a potential acquisition." Forbes also commented on the lack of progress due to low fundraising: "Despite Kim’s grand vision, few investors were willing to bet on the company. In six years, Kim has raised less than $5 million." During 2016, Lit Motors removed the ability to accept pre-order deposits.
 
Company postings throughout 2016 on social media continue to show only a rough model "EP-4" prototype driven at low speed, now for multiple years. Mentions of a need for at least two more prototypes indicate that the road to production is still far off. With limited pictures and videos of an unfinished single-seat vehicle driven at low speeds, and with either audio removed from videos or very loud gyroscope noise, critics are wary to expect that a production model can be built in the next few years, even if funding was secured. 
 
Despite consistent remarks of this project being vaporware, and with no production updates in multiple years, Lit Motors staff continued to insist that production was upcoming. Deposit refunds initially incurred a 15% fee, but Lit is now offering refunds without penalty. By 2017, newsletter content no longer featured physical testing, was starkly silent on production, and doesn't show any indication that Lit expects to have the ability to make a deliverable product. In 2018, Lit ceased email newsletters, social media updates, and let the website remain dormant with spam content for months on end. By the end of the year, a reconfigured website was published, though it still included information from several years ago, and no new progress updates.

On April 30, 2022, a post on Lit Motor's Facebook page stated that Daniel Kim had returned to the company after a five year hiatus. The company had relocated to a design lab in Portland, OR and hired new personnel. The company now seeks $9 million to develop a fully drivable prototype.

Kubo
The Kubo is a cargo scooter design dubbed the "pick-up truck of the developing world." Initial designs were for a fully electric scooter run on lithium iron phosphate batteries, designed to carry cargo boxes measuring up to 22 in. by 22 in. by 22 in. and weighing up to 300 pounds. With a top speed of 35 mph, it would have a range of at least 50 miles per charge. In an interview from May 28, 2013, Kim detailed the Kubo design as using lithium polymer batteries with a 40-45 mile range, with the ability to use the cargo space to hold additional batteries to extend the range to 200 miles. He claimed that by summer of 2013, a small production run of 5-10 units would occur, followed by 100-1,000 units in another 6 months time, before ramping up to 50,000 - 200,000 units for full production. He also claimed a selling price of $500–$800USD in China, and $2,000–4,000 in the United States.

In December 2013, Kubo was launched on Kickstarter with July 2014 delivery expected, but Lit Motors fell far short of meeting its funding goal with only $56,667 pledged of the $300,000 goal. Despite only 10 backers having pledged between $5,000 and $6,000 to purchase the Kubo scooter, Lit Motors affirmed that they are "definitely continuing with kubo!" in an update on the campaign. The project was silently dismissed and appears to have been abandoned, as the company's website has only one mention of Kubo, which directs to a blank page.

See also 
 Elio Motors
 Aptera Motors
 Peraves Ecomobile
 Toyota i-Road
 Yamaha Tricity
 BMW C1
 Carver One

References

External links

Electric vehicle manufacturers of the United States
Manufacturing companies based in San Francisco
2010 establishments in California
Experimental and prototype gyroscopic vehicles